Anderson Collegiate Vocational Institute (Anderson CVI, Anderson Collegiate, Anderson, or ACVI) is located in Whitby, Ontario within the Durham District School Board. Established in 1960, the school has students in grades 9–12 and offers a wide range of academic and extracurricular activities. Anderson is the only high school in Whitby that offers the gifted program and thus acts as a magnet school, attracting students across the municipality. This program provides an enriched and accelerated curriculum for students in specific courses from grades 9–11. Anderson's feeder elementary schools are Bellwood Public School, C. E. Broughton Public School, Dr. Robert Thornton Public School, Pringle Creek Public School (regular and gifted), and Jack Miner Public School (gifted only).

In 2007, then Principal John Morrison was named one of Canada's Outstanding Principals.

Notable alumni
Christine Elliott – politician
A. J. Cook – actress
K-os – musician
Sandy Hawley – jockey
 Andrew "Test" Martin - wrestler
Lori Melien – Olympian
Dyshawn Pierre – basketball player
Keith Primeau – professional hockey player
Wayne Primeau – professional hockey player

See also
List of high schools in Ontario

References

External links
 Anderson Collegiate Vocational Institute

High schools in the Regional Municipality of Durham
Education in Whitby, Ontario
1960 establishments in Ontario
Educational institutions established in 1960